The 2016 season for the Trek-Segafredo cycling team began in January at the Tour Down Under. As a UCI WorldTeam, they were automatically invited and obligated to send a squad to every event in the UCI World Tour.

Team roster

Riders who joined the team for the 2016 season

Riders who left the team during or after the 2015 season

Season victories

National, Continental and World champions 2016

Footnotes

References

External links

Trek-Segafredo
Trek–Segafredo (men's team)
Trek-Segafredo